The seventh series of the Ojarumaru anime series aired from April 5 to December 6, 2004 on NHK for a total of 90 episodes.

The series' opening theme is "Utahito" (詠人) by Saburō Kitajima. The ending theme is "Warera Gekkō Chō Chicchai Mono Club" (われら月光町ちっちゃいものクラブ Our Moonlight Town Tiny Things Club) by Rie Iwatsubo, Satomi Kōrogi, Ryō Naitō, Chinami Nishimura, and Ayaka Saitō.

Episodes 546, 565, 571, 613, 614, 617, and 630 were released on a compilation DVD (that also includes selected episodes from Series 8) by NHK Enterprises on January 25, 2008. Episodes 551 through 561, 563 through 569, 571, and 572 were streamed on Hulu Japan and U-Next, but were eventually removed from U-Next in 2014 and Hulu Japan in April 2015. However, the episodes are currently available on dTV and Video Pass.

Episodes

References

External links
 Series 7 episode list

Ojarumaru episode lists